The Big Fork River (French: Rivière Grande Fourche; Ojibwe: Baas-achaabaani-ziibi) is a stream in the U.S. state of Minnesota. Starting in the Chippewa National Forest at Dora Lake, it flows for  into the Rainy River.

See also
Big Fork River is the fifth longest river totally within the state of Minnesota.
List of rivers of Minnesota
List of longest streams of Minnesota
Plum Creek (Big Fork River)

References

References
 Minnesota Watersheds
 USGS Hydrologic Unit Map - State of Minnesota (1974)

Rivers of Itasca County, Minnesota
Rivers of Koochiching County, Minnesota
Rivers of Minnesota